Zura Tkemaladze (born 4 June 2000) is a Georgian tennis player.

Tkemaladze has a career high ATP doubles ranking of No. 1282 achieved on 25 October 2021.

Tkemaladze made his ATP main draw debut at the 2020 ATP Cup representing Georgia. 
He participated also in the 2022 ATP Cup as one of the five members of the Georgian team.

Tkemaladze represents Georgia at the Davis Cup, where he has a W/L record of 0–2.

References

External links
 
 
 

2000 births
Living people
Male tennis players from Georgia (country)
Sportspeople from Tbilisi